Jacque Sumpter Jenkins (May 6, 1921 – April 30, 1982) was an American football running back in the National Football League (NFL) for the Washington Redskins.  He played college football at Vanderbilt University where he was an All-SEC blocking back, and was drafted in the first round (tenth overall) of the 1943 NFL Draft.

References

1921 births
1982 deaths
People from Texarkana, Texas
Players of American football from Texas
American football running backs
Vanderbilt Commodores football players
Washington Redskins players
American football quarterbacks